Greater Mahé Region includes Mahé municipality and adjoining villages in Talassery taluk of Kannur and Vatakara taluk of Kozhikode in Kerala state.

The following are the villages in Kerala that are considered as part of Greater Mahé:
Chokli, Talassery taluk in Kannur district
Panniyannur, Talassery taluk in Kannur district
New Mahe, Talassery taluk in Kannur district
Azhiyur, Vatakara taluk in Kozhikode district

Proposed New Mahe Municipality
The proposed New Mahe Municipality comprises
Azhiyur panchayat, Vatakara taluk, Kozhikode district, Kerala
New Mahe panchayat, Thalassery taluk, Kannur district, Kerala
Chokli panchayat, Thalassery taluk, Kannur district, Kerala
Panniyannur panchayat, Thalassery taluk, Kannur district, Kerala

Mahe district